Joanne Pence is the author of a long running and successful romantic culinary mystery series. Fourteen books were published 1993 to 2006.

Her amateur sleuth Angie Amalfi is an underemployed food writer and gourmet chef in San Francisco, romantically involved with homicide inspector Paavo Smith. As well as fitting in the culinary mystery niche, her books are followed by romance novelist enthusiasts  and also have a humorous, screwball adventure flavor.

Joanne Pence was born Joanne Lopez in San Francisco. She attended UC Berkeley and worked 1970-1998 as an operations analysis manager in the Social Security administration. She is married to David Pence and has two children.

She is a member of Sisters in Crime, Novelists, Inc, and Romance Writers of America.

Books
Something’s Cooking, 1993.
Too Many Cooks, 1994.
Cooking up Trouble, 1995.
Cooking Most Deadly, 1996.
Cook’s Night Out, 1998.
Cooks Overboard, 1998.
A Cook in Time, 1999.
To Catch a Cook, 00.
Bell, Book and Candle, 02.
If Cooks Could Kill, 03
Two Cooks a Killing, 03.
Courting Disaster, 04.
Red Hot Murder, 06.
The Da Vinci Cook, 06.
The Thirteenth Santa ’11. Novella
Misteltoe and Mayhem (with Judi McCoy, Katherine Hall Page and Christi Ridgeway), 2004. (non series)

See also
List of female detective/mystery writers
List of female detective characters

References

20th-century American novelists
21st-century American novelists
American mystery writers
American women novelists
Living people
San Francisco Bay Area literature
Writers from the San Francisco Bay Area
Women mystery writers
20th-century American women writers
21st-century American women writers
Year of birth missing (living people)